The 6th Race of Champions was a non-Championship motor race, run to Formula One rules, held on 21 March 1971 at Brands Hatch circuit in Kent, England. The race was run over 50 laps of the circuit, and was won by Clay Regazzoni in a Ferrari 312B2.

Classification

References 
 Results at Silhouet.com 
 Results at F1 Images.de 
 

Race of Champions
Race of Champions (Brands Hatch)
Race of Champions
Race of Champions